Penicillium caperatum is an anamorph fungus species of the genus of Penicillium which was isolated from soil in Papua New Guinea .

See also
List of Penicillium species

References 

caperatum
Fungi described in 1973
Fungi of New Guinea